The Ford Arena is a 9,737-seat multi-purpose arena in Beaumont, Texas, USA. The arena has 34,000 sq ft of exhibit space available for conventions and exhibitions.  It also includes 7 production offices, 3 dressing rooms, a 2,448 sq ft VIP Club, a 1,107 sq ft party patio, concession stands, and restrooms.  It is part of a larger suburban municipal complex called Ford Park. Spectra Entertainment replaced SMG as property manager in January, 2017.  SMG had managed the property since venue opening in 2003 until the change.

Tenants

Current

Ford Arena is the current Beaumont home of Disney on Ice and Stars on Ice.

Former
Ford Arena was most recently home to Oxford City FC of Texas (formerly the Texas Strikers) of the Major Arena Soccer League.  The arena was also home to the ABA Southeast Texas Mavericks basketball team, NIFL Beaumont Drillers indoor football team, and the ECHL Texas Wildcatters ice hockey team.

See also
Ford Park
Montagne Center
Beaumont Civic Center
Fair Park Coliseum

References

External links
Ford Park official website

American football venues in Texas
Convention centers in Texas
Indoor arenas in Texas
Indoor ice hockey venues in the United States
Indoor soccer venues in the United States
Sports venues in Beaumont, Texas
Oxford City FC of Texas
2003 establishments in Texas
Sports venues completed in 2003
Music venues in Beaumont, Texas